The Hermit (IX) is the ninth trump or Major Arcana card in most traditional tarot decks. It is used in game playing as well as in divination.

Description 
The Rider–Waite version of the card shows an old man, standing on a mountain peak, carrying a staff in one hand and a lit lantern containing a six-pointed star in the other. In the background is a mountain range.

According to Eden Gray, his lantern is the Lamp of Truth, used to guide the unknowing, his patriarch's staff helps him navigate narrow paths as he seeks enlightenment and his cloak is a form of discretion.

Interpretation

According to A.E. Waite's 1910 book Pictorial Key to the Tarot, the Hermit card carries several divinatory associations:

9. THE HERMIT. Prudence, circumspection; also and especially treason, dissimulation, roguery, corruption. Reversed:  Concealment, disguise, policy fear, unreasoned caution.

The card is usually thought to connote aspects of healing/recovery, particularly the kind that happens over time. In that regard, The Hermit is sometimes considered the mature and wiser version of The Magician. As such, both cards represent the astrological sign of Virgo. The Hermit is the "withdrawal from events and relationship to introspect and gather strength". Seeking the inner voice or calling upon vision from within. A need of understanding and advice, or a wise person  who will offer knowing guidance. A card of personal experience and thoughtful temperance.

Examples

In other media
A version of Pamela Colman Smith's Hermit designed by Barrington Colby is depicted on the inner jacket sleeve of Led Zeppelin IV.
In the X/1999 tarot version made by CLAMP, The Hermit is Satsuki Yatouji.
JoJo's Bizarre Adventure: Stardust Crusaders uses tarot cards to name character's Stands. Joseph Joestar has the Stand Hermit Purple, with abilities inspired by thoughtography.
The Binding of Isaac utilizes tarot cards as pickups that can be used to gain/activate in-game abilities, the Hermit warping the player to the current floor’s shop.

References

Major Arcana